The 2012 Qingdao Jonoon F.C. season is Qingdao's 16th consecutive season in the top division of Chinese football. Qingdao will also be competing in the Chinese FA Cup.

Players
As of 5 March 2012

First team

Reserve squad

On loan

Competitions

Chinese Super League

League table

Matches

Chinese FA Cup

References

Qingdao Hainiu F.C. (1990) seasons
Qingdao Jonoon F.C.